Labdia leucatella is a moth in the family Cosmopterigidae. It was described by Snellen in 1901. It is known from Java.

References

Natural History Museum Lepidoptera generic names catalog

Labdia
Moths described in 1901